The Cloughjordan Ecovillage is an ongoing project to create an eco-village community with commitments to ecological, social and economic sustainability. The first residents moved into their homes in the eco-village in December 2009.

A district heating system powered by a wood chip boiler provides hot water to the homes.

A community-supported agriculture scheme was established in 2008. Members of Cloughjordan community farm are drawn from the eco-village and surrounding area. The farm aims to supply members' families with much of their food using biodynamic principles. The farm cultivates 12 acres within the eco-village.

Village Education Research and Training (VERT) is a working group within the eco-village. It is committed to running courses encouraging best practice in sustainable living.

Twenty nine near zero-energy buildings in the village were open to the public during the "Near Zero Energy Buildings Open Doors Ireland" event held in November 2013. Other NZEB Open Doors events took place in Belgium, Germany, Austria, Sweden, Hungary, France, Malta, Slovenia, Poland under the NZEB 2021 program promoted by the European Union.

A community amphitheatre, created within the eco-village was opened by Michael D. Higgins, President of Ireland in April 2017.

References

Cloughjordan
Ecovillages
Intentional communities in Ireland